The campaign in South Arabia during World War I was a minor struggle for control of the port city of Aden, an important way station for ships on their way from Asia to the Suez Canal. The British Empire declared war on the Ottoman Empire on 5 November 1914, and the Ottomans responded with their own declaration on 11 November. From the beginning, the Ottomans had planned an invasion of Britain's Aden Protectorate in cooperation with the local Arab tribes. The Ottomans had gathered in some strength on the Cheikh Saïd, a peninsula which juts out into the Red Sea towards the island of Perim.

At the start of the war, the British had one force stationed in the Aden Protectorate, the Aden Brigade, which was part of the British Indian Army. In November 1914, an Ottoman force from Yemen attacked Aden, but was driven off by the Brigade. Although fighting in South Arabia effectively ceased after June 1916, the last Ottoman troops did not surrender until March 1919.

Capture of Cheikh Saïd

The 29th Indian Brigade, under Brigadier-General H. V. Cox, CB, then on its way from India to Suez, was ordered to interrupt its voyage to capture Cheikh Saïd and destroy the Ottoman works, armaments, and wells there. On 10 November 1914, transports conveying three battalions of the 29th Indian Brigade and the 23rd Sikh Pioneers arrived off the coast of the peninsula. They were accompanied by the armoured cruiser HMS Duke of Edinburgh, which opened fire on the Ottoman defences while the transports were seeking a satisfactory landing-place. The point that had been at first selected proved impossible on account of the weather, and the troops had to land a little way off under the cover of the fire of the cruiser. They stormed the Ottomans' positions and compelled them to retreat, leaving their field guns behind. The sailors took active part in the fighting with the troops, and a naval demolition party assisted, on 11 November, in destroying the Ottoman fortifications. Having accomplished its task, the British force re-embarked and continued on to Suez. It was not considered advisable at this time to push an expedition inland. The Ottomans, consequently, retained some forces on the northern boundary of the Aden Protectorate.

Seven months later they reoccupied Cheikh Saïd and endeavoured from there to effect a landing on the north coast of Perim. This attack was successfully repulsed by the garrison of the island, the 23rd Sikh Pioneers.

Land campaign

Battle of Lahij

Sultanate of Lahij
In July 1915 an Ottoman force from North Yemen crossed the frontier of the Aden hinterland and advanced towards Lahij, which was at this time one of the most important towns in South Arabia and the capital of the Abdali Sultanate of Lahij (Lahaj). Placed in an oasis, surrounded by a fertile plain with the deserts beyond, it was the centre of trade between Aden, a British crown colony, and its hinterland, the princely states under a protectorate. In the years leading up to the war, relations between Britain and Lahij had been friendly, the British paying the sultan a subsidy for the occupation of certain land in the interior and protecting him and his agricultural people against the tribes of the desert, who frequently raided them. Propagandising during the war, British historian F. A. McKenzie wrote of the sultan:
Under our protection the Sultan of Lahaj had waxed very prosperous. His city, with its palace, its gallows— built for ornament rather than use—its purely Oriental life, its fine horses, its little show army, and its constant traffic in camels and caravans, seemed like a vision out of the Arabian Nights. When war broke out the Abdali Sultan proved that his loyalty to Britain was real. Though other tribes turned against us he came to our side and prepared to help us. He soon made himself an object of special detestation to the [Ottoman] and to many of the surrounding tribes by his open and unwavering friendship for Britain.

Siege
The sultan sent word to General D. G. L. Shaw, commanding the Aden Brigade, that the Ottomans were advancing from Mawiyah to attack him, and asked for help. General Shaw ordered the Aden Movable Column, under Lieutenant-Colonel H. E. A. Pearson, towards Lahij. The Aden Camel Troop was despatched to reconnoitre. It discovered a strong Ottoman force beyond Lahij, supported by a large number of Arab tribesmen. The Camel Troop fell back on Lahij, where it was reinforced by the advance guard of the Movable Column, numbering two hundred and fifty rifles, with two ten-pounder guns. This advance guard had moved up under most trying conditions. The heat was intense, there was great shortage of water, and progress was difficult over the sand. The main body of the Column was so delayed by difficulties of transport and by shortage of water that it did not reach Lahij at all.

The British in the sultan's capital found themselves faced by several thousand Ottoman troops and twenty guns. In addition, Arab tribesmen had rallied by the thousand to help the Ottomans. The British were backed by the few hundred men of the sultan of Lahij's native army. The Arab camp-followers of the Aden detachment deserted them in a body at the most critical hour, taking with them all their camels. Fighting opened on the evening of Sunday, 4 July. The Ottoman forces made several attacks against the British line, but each was driven off. Although after the battle the efforts of the Royal Artillery drew a tribute from General Shaw, the superior Ottoman artillery had kindled fires in different parts of Lahij, and the British were in danger of being outflanked and cut off by the Arab tribal horsemen. The sultan was killed with many of his men. When the main Aden Column never arrived, the British withdrew on 5 July with the loss of three officers wounded, but the main loss was not so much in men as in prestige.

Analysis
In the official report on the operations issued by the Government of India much stress was laid on "the intense heat, sand, and shortage of water", and "[t]he desertion of the camel-drivers and the severe climatic conditions so delayed and distressed the main body as to necessitate a withdrawal from Lahij". McKenzie notes that "we do not seem to have made such arrangements for transport and for water supply as would have prepared us for the difficulties which every experienced traveller knew we would have to face. . . But the severe heat of the climate, the potential treachery of hired Arabs, and the shortage of water were all of them factors which had been familiar from the beginning to the Indian authorities, and, one might suppose, ought to have been allowed for."

Reinforcements from India

After the debacle at Lahij, the British force fell back on the Kawr. The Ottomans followed them up and occupied Shaikh Othman, a town about two miles inland from the harbour of Aden. This place was formerly part of the Sultanate of Lahij, within the British protectorate. The Ottomans at this stage held practically the whole of the Aden hinterland, except immediately around the crown colony itself. They had reoccupied Cheikh Saïd and had destroyed Lahij. The Indian authorities, under Commander-in-Chief Beauchamp Duff, decided to increase the Aden garrison after "subsequent Turkish victories". Major-General Sir George J. Younghusband, a soldier with a distinguished career, succeeded to the command of the Aden Brigade.

On 20 July 1915, troops from the Aden Brigade, the 28th Indian Brigade, 1/B Battery, HAC, 1/1st Berkshire Battery, RHA, and a detachment of Sappers and Miners, under the command of Lieutenant-Colonel A. M. S. Elsmie, a soldier well trained in frontier fighting, surprised the Ottomans at Shaikh Othman, completely defeated them and drove them out of the place. Between fifty and sixty Ottoman soldiers were killed and wounded, and several hundred men, mostly Arab tribesmen, were made prisoners. This success was followed up in the following month by an attack by a small column on an Ottoman post between Lahij and Shaikh Othman. The Ottomans were driven from the town. Another attack in a different direction was equally successful. Reports reached Aden that the Ottomans were preparing to retire from Lahij itself, and in September a column under Colonel Elsmie set out in the direction of Waht. Here it surprised a force of seven hundred Ottomans, with eight guns, who were supported by about a thousand Arabs. The Ottomans were driven back, and Waht fell to the British troops, who had been aided both on sea and land by the cooperation of the cruiser HMS Philomel of the New Zealand Naval Forces, under Captain Percival Hill-Thompson.

Ottoman claims of victory
A series of minor engagements and skirmishes between the Ottomans and Arabs and the British followed, during which the latter were generally successful, but found it impossible to hold the country far inland. Early in 1916 the Ottomans claimed that the British had been driven back on to Aden itself, and had retreated to within range of the covering fire of their warships, where they had been inactive for some months. Many of the Ottoman claims were greatly exaggerated, and some wholly false. In February 1916, Major John Pretyman Newman, MP, asked in the British Parliament for any information about the fighting near Aden. Austen Chamberlain, then Secretary of State for India, responded that the Ottoman claim of success which had recently been put forward would seem to have been founded on an engagement which took place on 12 January between a reconnoitring column of the Aden garrison and an Ottoman force in the neighbourhood of Shaikh Othman. The loss on our side was one British officer and thirty-five Indian rank and file killed, and four British and thirty-five Indian rank and file wounded. The enemy losses were severe, amounting to about two hundred killed and wounded. The British column was neither annihilated nor defeated, but withdrew when the purpose of the movement was completed, Chamberlain said.

Later on, the Ottomans officially claimed to have scored a substantial victory in further heavy fighting around Shaikh Othman and Bir Ahmad. This was a sheer invention. In January 1916, the Aden Movable Column moved out to protect some friendly troops to the east of the Aden Protectorate against Ottoman troops who had been sent to coerce them. The column located the Ottoman force near Subar, and defeated it. The general position was so unsatisfactory, however, that in April 1916, it was decided, on the suggestion of the Government of India, that ladies should not be allowed to land at Aden without receiving permission from the Commander-in-Chief in India.

Stalemate
The eruption of the British-sponsored Arab Revolt in the Hejaz diverted Ottoman attention from Aden in the summer of 1916. Those Ottoman troops which remained reverted to the defensive, while the British built an eleven-mile-long defensive perimeter around Aden. They did not attempt to resecure lost territories in the hinterland, and no major fighting with the British took place after 1916.

End of the campaign 
On 30 October 1918, the Ottoman Empire signed the Armistice of Mudros, where it agreed to surrender all its garrisons outside of Anatolia. However, the armistice failed to be immediately effective on Ottoman forces in Yemen, as some commanders initially refused to surrender:

 Some Ottoman officials (such as Ottoman governor Mahmood Nadim) refused to surrender to Britain as this would bolster the British political position in the region, instead preferring to align themselves with Imam Yahya, who was establishing the Mutawakkilite Kingdom of Yemen.
 In contrast, other Ottoman officials (such as Ismail Effendi, commanding troops at Taiz), refused to lay down their arms in the absence of British forces, as this would bolster Imam Yahya.
 This also included 12 local sheikhs who wanted to the placed under British sovereignty, as this would allow them to remain independent within their own territory while receiving a stipend, whereas the Imam would make them pay tithes.
 Some Ottoman officials in Asir were still owed debts and demanded to be paid 100,000 pounds before surrendering. These forces surrendered at Al Luḩayyah (10 January 1919), Al Hudaydah (by 16 January) and Cheikh Saïd (19 January) after Britain and the Idrisid Emirate of Asir provided the requested money, before being embarked to Suez from Kamran Island on 7 February.
 Elias Bey, Sheikh of Bajil and Kuhra, did not surrender before conferring with the Ottoman envoy from Constantinople, who arrived at Al Hudaydah on 13 January 1919 and explained the political situation.
 Colonel Ghalib Bey, commanding forces at Az Zaydiyah, did not believe that the Ottomans had actually signed an armistice and refused to obey orders from the Commander-in-Chief of Yemen, Mahmud Tewfik Pasha, to surrender, instead opting to fight to the death. Az Zaydiyah fell to the Idrisid Emirate of Asir in March 1919.

On 15 December 1918, Britain recaptured Lahej from Ottoman forces in a swift military operation. By 14 February 1919, 3100 Ottomans of all ranks remained active in Yemen. By 31 March, all Ottoman forces in Yemen had surrendered, and Mahmud Tewfik Pasha, commander-in-chief of Yemen, was in Aden.

Naval campaign

Uses of the South Arab ports during the war
On 18 October 1914, a convoy of ten troopships carrying the New Zealand Expeditionary Force was escorted by the Imperial Japanese battlecruiser Ibuki out of Wellington. It joined a group of twenty-eight ships carrying the First Australian Imperial Force, and the total convoy, with Ibuki and the Australian cruiser , crossed the ocean, which was being patrolled by the Japanese protected cruiser Chikuma. While Sydney was sidetracked, and ended up in the Battle of Cocos, the rest of the convoy reached Aden on 25 October.

On 9 November 1914, a small landing party, numbering five officers, one surgeon, and forty-seven petty officers and men, under Lieutenant Hellmuth von Mücke, was separated from their ship, the SMS Emden during the Battle of Cocos, and piloted the Ayesha to the Dutch port of Padang on the west coast of Sumatra. There von Mücke arranged a rendezvous with the German freighter Choising, which transported him and his men to the Ottoman city of Hodeida in Yemen. Once on the Arabian Peninsula, von Mücke and his men experienced months of delay securing the assistance of local Turkish officials to return to Germany. At last he decided to lead his men on an over-water voyage up the east coast of the Red Sea to Jiddah. Ultimately, Von Mücke and forty-eight of his men returned to Berlin.

When the Arabs of the revolt of June 1916 attacked the port of Jiddah, they were supported by the seaplane carrier , based at Aden.

Occupation of Kamaran
On 17 February 1915, the British Resident in Aden, Brigadier William Crawford Walton, wired the Government of India that dhows bearing telegrams, mail and money from Jiddah had made it to Ottoman headquarters in Yemen, and that it was necessary that these be stopped. He proposed the occopuation of Kamaran with 200 men from the RMS Empress of Russia, the RMS Empress of Asia and HMS Minto. This had the support of the Admiralty, the Commander-in-Chief at Port Said—who wished to use Kamaran as a "naval base for small vessels"—and the India Office, which duly informed the Viceroy of India to give the necessary orders. The viceroy demurred, fearing that the local population would be "unlikely to acquiesce", that an occupation might "alarm the Idrisi", was likely to be misunderstood by Muslims, and would reduce the defences of Aden, at just the moment when the Turks were advancing. On 3 March the India Office rescinded its order, but when intelligence suggested that some Germans stranded in Massawa in Italian Eritrea at the outbreak of war were attempting to sail across the sea to Arabia, the resident renewed his request for 200 men (7 March). Again the viceroy refused (11 March).

References

Further reading

 Bidwell, Robin L. "The Turkish attack on Aden 1915–1918", Arabian Studies, 6 (1982), 171–94.
 Bruce, Anthony. The Last Crusade: The Palestine Campaign in the First World War. London: Murray, 2002.
 Connelly, Mark. "The British Campaign in Aden, 1914–1918". Journal of the Centre for First World War Studies, 2:1 (2005) 65–96.
 
Kühn, Thomas. "Shaping and Reshaping Colonial Ottomanism: Contesting Boundaries of Difference and Integration in Ottoman Yemen, 1872–1919." Comparative Studies of South Asia, Africa and the Middle East, 27:2 (2007), 315–31.
 Mehra, R. N. Aden and Yemen, 1905–1919. Delhi: Agram Prakashan, 1988.
 Walker, G. Goold. Honourable Artillery Company in The Great War 1914–1919. London: Seeley, Service & Co. Ltd., 1930.

External links

Turkey in the First World War: Arabian Campaign
Photograph of camel being unloaded by crane in Aden, 15 September 1915
Photograph of camels aboard a ship at Aden, 15 September 1915

Campaigns and theatres of World War I
Middle Eastern theatre of World War I
British Empire in World War I
Ottoman Empire in World War I
Modern history of Yemen
Aden
South Arabia